Shaxi is a town under the administration of the prefecture-level city of Zhongshan in Guangdong Province, China, located to the west of downtown Zhongshan. It is administered by 15 neighborhoods and one community committee.

The town is the ancestral hometown for about 70,000 overseas Chinese in such organizations as the Hook Sin Tong. The Town speaks a unique language called the Longdu dialect.

In 2002, the GDP of  Shaxi reached RMB 2.1 billion and foreign exchange earnings topped RMB 147 million.  It is one of the leading manufacturing centers of casual clothing in the world producing blue jeans and shirts. Each year it holds one of the world's largest trade shows for casual wear, the Chinese International Casual Wear Trade Show.

In 2002, it was designated as "China's Most Famous Town for Casual Wear" by the Chinese Textile Industry Association and Chinese Garment Association. There are currently 710 clothing manufacturers in the town, employing approximately 43,000 workers. In 2002, the township produced over 200 million garments, earning RMB 6.3 billion in sales and US $123 million in foreign currency.

The sweatshop conditions of the Lifeng Clothes Factory in Shaxi while producing Vigaze Jeans, a company based in Istanbul,  were featured in the 2005 documentary China Blue.

References

External links
 The Zhongshan News 
 Shaxi Township Government 
 Documentary "China Blue" 
Lifeng Clothes Company:
 Lifeng Factory  (archived copy 2003)
 Lifeng Factory  (archived copy 2007)

Zhongshan